William Mair (1830–1920) was a Scottish minister who served as Moderator of the General Assembly of the Church of Scotland in 1897/98.

Life

He spent most of his life as minister of Earlston Church in the Scottish Borders.

In 1897 he was elected Moderator. He was succeeded in 1898 by Rev Thomas Leishman.

Publications
My Life (1911) autobiography

References

1830 births
1920 deaths
19th-century Ministers of the Church of Scotland
Moderators of the General Assembly of the Church of Scotland
20th-century Ministers of the Church of Scotland